Mount Lawson State Park is a  park situated approximately 60 km east of Wodonga in the state of Victoria, Australia. It was protected for its diverse vegetation, rare flora and fauna, aesthetic qualities and cultural heritage.

See also
 Protected areas of Victoria (Australia)

References 

State parks of Victoria (Australia)
Protected areas established in 1988
Parks of Hume (region)